The badminton competition at the 2018 Central American and Caribbean Games was held in Barranquilla, Colombia from 28 July to 2 August at the Coliseo Universidad del Norte.

Medal summary

Men's events

Women's events

Mixed events

Medal table

References

External links
2018 Central American and Caribbean Games – Badminton

2018 Central American and Caribbean Games events
Central American and Caribbean Games
2018
Badminton in Colombia